Chucoa is a genus of South American flowering plants in the family Asteraceae.

 Species
 Chucoa ilicifolia Cabrera – Peru
 Chucoa lanceolata (H.Beltrán & Ferreyra) G.Sancho, S.E.Freire & Katinas - Bolivia, Peru

References

Asteraceae genera
Mutisieae
Flora of South America
Taxa named by Ángel Lulio Cabrera